The Lithuanian Peasants Party (LVP) was a political party in Lithuania.

History
The party was established in 1990 as the Lithuanian Peasants Union, before becoming the Lithuanian Peasants Party in 1994. It won a single seat in the 1996 elections and four seats in the 2000 elections.

In 2001 the party merged with the New Democracy Party to form the Union of Peasants and New Democracy Parties.

Election results

References

Defunct agrarian political parties
Defunct political parties in Lithuania
Political parties established in 1990
Political parties disestablished in 2001